A total of seventy streams that are at least  long flow through the U.S. state of Idaho. All of these streams originate in the United States except the Kootenai River (third-longest) and the Moyie River (thirty-first-longest), both of which begin in the Canadian province of British Columbia.

All but four of the streams lie within the large basin of the Columbia River, although the river itself does not flow through Idaho. Consequently, the predominant direction of the state's streamflow is northwest towards the Columbia River and its mouth at the Pacific Ocean. The only other major drainage basin in Idaho is the Great Salt Lake watershed in the state's southeastern corner, which is part of the Great Basin and has no outlet to the ocean. The Bear River, the second-longest stream, is within this watershed, along with the Malad River, Deep Creek, and the Logan River.

Source data for the table below comes from topographic maps created by the United States Geological Survey and published online by TopoQuest, and on the Idaho Road and Recreation Atlas, the National Hydrography Dataset, the Geographic Names Information System, and other sources as noted. In the table, total lengths are given in miles (mi) and kilometers (km).

Table

Map

See also

 List of rivers of Idaho
 List of longest rivers in the United States by state
 List of longest rivers of the United States (by main stem)

Notes

References

Works cited

External links

 Map of Idaho streams published by the Idaho Department of Environmental Quality

Longest
Streams,longest
Idaho